Odites consignata is a moth in the family Depressariidae. It was described by Edward Meyrick in 1921. It is found in South Africa, where it has been recorded from KwaZulu-Natal.

The wingspan is about 20 mm. The forewings are ochreous white with the discal stigmata small and blackish, a faint cloudy spot of grey irroration (sprinkles) beneath the second. There is an almost marginal series of blackish dots around the apex and termen. The hindwings are ochreous white.

References

Endemic moths of South Africa
Moths described in 1921
Odites
Taxa named by Edward Meyrick